The 2015 Columbia Lions football team represented Columbia University in the 2015 NCAA Division I FCS football season. They were led by first year head coach Al Bagnoli and played their home games at Robert K. Kraft Field at Lawrence A. Wien Stadium. They were a member of the Ivy League. They finished the season 2–8, 1–6 in Ivy League play to finish a tie for seventh place. Columbia averaged 5,988 fans per game.

Schedule

References

Columbia
Columbia Lions football seasons
Columbia Lions football